Cyphellocalathus is a genus of fungi in the family Tricholomataceae. This is a monotypic genus, containing the single species Cyphellocalathus cecropiae, found in Bolivia.

See also

 List of Tricholomataceae genera

References

Tricholomataceae
Monotypic Agaricales genera
Fungi of Bolivia